Mike Bottom (c. 1956) is the ninth head coach of the Michigan Wolverines swimming and diving program at the University of Michigan.

His men's team finished as champions at the 2013 NCAA Division I Swimming and Diving Championships.

Swimming career
Bottom was a member of the U.S. Olympic swimming team in 1980, and thus boycotted the Olympic Games that year.

Coaching career
Bottom served as assistant coach for the swimming team at Auburn University from 1991 until 1994, before serving as assistant coach for the University of South Carolina swimming team until 1997. From 1998 until 2007, he was men's co-head coach for the University of California, Berkeley swimming team.

He was the personal coach for Gary Hall Jr., and later worked at the swimming club founded by Hall and his father.

In June 2008, it was announced that Bottom would take over from Bob Bowman as head coach of the University of Michigan's swimming team.

Personal life
Bottom was born in Akron, Ohio. His older brother Joe is also a former competition swimmer, and they both trained at Santa Clara Swim Club under George Haines.

Bottom graduated from University of South Carolina in 1978 with a Bachelor's in psychology. In 1993, he graduated summa cum laude with a Master's degree in counselling psychology from Auburn University.

Bottom and his wife Lauralyn have two daughters (Micaiah and Dublyn).

References

External links
Michigan profile

Living people
American male butterfly swimmers
American swimming coaches
Auburn University alumni
Auburn Tigers swimming coaches
California Golden Bears swimming coaches
Michigan Wolverines swimming coaches
Olympic swimmers of the United States
USC Trojans men's swimmers
USC Trojans swimming coaches
Universiade medalists in swimming
Year of birth missing (living people)
Universiade gold medalists for the United States
Universiade bronze medalists for the United States
Swimmers at the 1980 Summer Olympics
Medalists at the 1979 Summer Universiade